Michael "Mike" Pavone is an American film director, screenwriter, television producer/writer and former executive vice president of WWE Studios with WWE before his departure from the company in August 2011.

Career

Film and television career
In 1992, Pavone was a writer for the television series Renegade. In 1993, he was a writer for the television series Against the Grain. He adapted a play for television in 1993 for Trouble Shooters: Trapped Beneath the Earth. In 1994, he was a writer for the unsold television pilot Golden Gate. Pavone directed and wrote the film Chameleon in 1995 and in that same year he was a writer for the television series Medicine Ball. He was also a writer for the television series The Monroes and The Client in 1995.

In 2002 Pavone was a writer for the television series Street Time. In 2005 Michael Pavone became a writer for the hit Fox Network show Prison Break. He is credited for writing the episode "Cell Test" in Season 1 of the show.

Pavane has also worked as television director, directing episodes of Jack & Jill, Everwood and the aforementioned The Client series. As well as directing the films That's What I Am (2011), The Reunion (2011), which were both produced by WWE Studios.

WWE
It was reported in the August 4, 2008 edition of the Wrestling Observer Newsletter that Pavone was hired by WWE as a creative consultant to the writers of the company's shows Monday Night Raw on USA Network and Friday Night SmackDown on Syfy
In June 2009, Pavone took over as executive VP of WWE Studios, replacing Michael Lake, who left the company to pursue other opportunities.

Los Angeles Times reported on August 12, 2011, Mike Pavone has left the company. There was no public reason given for his departure. Pavone's exit from WWE Studios came after the lackluster box office performance of the film That's What I Am.

References

External links
 

American film directors
American film producers
American media executives
American male screenwriters
American television directors
American television producers
American television writers
Living people
Place of birth missing (living people)
Year of birth missing (living people)
American male television writers